Alex O'Brien and Jared Palmer were the defending champions.

Mark Knowles and Max Mirnyi won in the final 6–3, 6–4, against O'Brien and Palmer.

Seeds

Draw

Draw

External links
 Main Doubles Draw

2000 Qatar Open
2000 ATP Tour
Qatar Open (tennis)